Queensway is the name of a number of roads in central Birmingham, especially those that formed the A4400 Inner Ring Road. The name most often refers to the Great Charles Street Queensway tunnel, part of the A38.

The Queensways were built as dual carriageway major roads in the 1960s and 1970s. Junctions on the road were largely grade separated, with pedestrians kept physically separate from vehicular traffic and most junctions allowing vehicles staying on the road to pass over or under those using the junction. It is now widely regarded as one of the classic urban planning blunders of the 20th century. Although seen as a revolutionary improvement when the first section opened in 1960, the 'Concrete Collar', as it became known, was viewed by council planners as an impenetrable barrier for the expansion of the city centre. In particular, it became unpopular with pedestrians, who were required to use subways at the roundabouts, an unpopular route due to fear of crime. According to the Birmingham Big City Plan published in 2011, the Ring Road has restricted open spaces, growth and economic activity. It has also made the city centre more crowded and harder to navigate.

Since 1988, the city council has sought to recreate links between the city centre and the neighbouring areas, enlarging the city centre and improving the pedestrian environment across the city, with an emphasis on shifting vehicular movements out to The Middleway.

History
It was first planned by Herbert Manzoni in 1943 and an Act of Parliament permitting construction was passed in 1946. Due to financial controls, the first part of the ring road, Smallbrook Queensway, did not begin construction until 1957 and was completed in 1960. The entire ring road was opened by Elizabeth II in 1971.

However, since the 1990s, some of Queensway has been altered in order to reverse the earlier strict separation of road and pedestrian traffic with a view to providing a more attractive environment for pedestrians, deter through traffic, and reducing the severance effects of the Inner Ring Road. A number of the altered junctions are in regeneration areas, such as Masshouse. In early 2008, the St Chads Queensway area near the St. Chad's Cathedral was modified to remove pedestrian underpasses and bring all pedestrian and car traffic back on to the traditional street level.

The road previously consisted of the following roads (anticlockwise from A38(M) approach (Aston Expressway):
 St Chads Queensway (now A38)
 Lancaster Street Queensway
 St Chads Circus Queensway
 Paradise Circus Queensway, below Birmingham Central Library (now A38)
 Great Charles Queensway (now A38)
 Suffolk Street Queensway (now A38)
 Holloway Circus Queensway (now A38)
 Smallbrook Queensway (unclassified)
 St Martin's Queensway (demolished to make way for new Bullring development)
 Moor Street Queensway (now B4100) rebuilt into "Bus mall" renamed Moor Street Ringway
 James Watt Queensway (now B4114)
 Masshouse Circus Queensway, formerly roundabout over James Watt Queensway (demolished).
In recent years many have been rebuilt and downgraded and now far more resemble city streets. These redevelopments were championed by the city council as breaking the 'concrete collar' around the city centre (especially in the Masshouse area), with the aim of making the city more friendly to pedestrian navigation, and improving the aesthetic appearance of the city. Some motorists, however, bemoan the reduction of road capacity and point to the regular congestion on the remodelled sections.

Controversially, pedestrian crossings are replacing underpasses. The A4400 still exists as the surface level road where the A38 runs in tunnels.

References

External links
Multimap: Queensway

Transport in Birmingham, West Midlands
Roads in the West Midlands (county)